Seventeen is a 2004 novel by American author Shan Serafin. Originally published as a work for adults in English, the story now reaches a demographic of young adults and college students in several countries throughout the world, particularly females.

Seventeen is the story of a female adolescent named Sophia. The premise is that of a seventeen-year-old, who, in grappling with the angst of finding one's place in the world, gives herself seven days to either find her purpose or end her life. This, Serafin's literary debut, is of additional significance because he wrote it from the point of view of the opposite gender.

Of perhaps deliberate ambiguity is the story's setting, which indisputably is modern-day Manhattan, but in concerning itself with a "major university in town," never clarifies whether said university is NYU or Columbia. In either case, there are several pointed attacks at upper class academia in the work, and it is likely that the lack of precision is Serafin's attempt to render a general critique of prestigious institutions rather than a specific one.

Representation
Serafin is represented by Bancroft Press

Notes

External links 
 TheJacketFlap reference to Seventeen
 Publisher's webpage for Seventeen
 FlamingNet review of Seventeen
 TheBestReviews article on Seventeen
 Young Adult Book Central on Shan Serafin
 Corvalis Library info card on Seventeen

Fiction about suicide
Works about adolescence
2004 novels
Novels set in Manhattan